Elleholm is a former Danish town in Blekinge, Sweden. The town existed between 1450 and 1600, when it was abandoned.

The town was based around a former castle, called Sjöborg (meaning "Lake Castle") which today is a Hill fort.

The name "Elleholm" means "Isle of Alder", from old Danish.

See also 
Elleholms house

Blekinge County
Ancient cities